Cristina Marsillach (born 30 September 1963) is a Spanish actress.

Biography

She was born in Madrid in a family of actors, the daughter of the actor Adolfo Marsillach and the actress and model María Teresa del Río Martínez del Cerro, who was also Miss Spain, 1960. Her sister Blanca is also an actress.

Cristina Marsillach debuted at age thirteen in the television series, "Mrs. Garcia Confesses", thanks to her father who was the director. Cristina went on to a film career with appearances in "El Poderoso Influjo de la Luna", "Crime in the Family", "The Sea and Time", and "Last Days with Teresa". She also appeared in such television shows as "High School" and the second season of "Chronicle of the Sunrise".

She is the artistic director of the Marsillach Acting Academy in Madrid, Spain.

Her best known film is 1986's Every Time We Say Goodbye, in which she starred opposite Tom Hanks.

Filmography
 El poderoso influjo de la luna - (1981)
Estoy en crisis - (1982)
 Últimas tardes con Teresa - (1983)
 The Trap - (1985)
 Every Time We Say Goodbye – (1986)
 Opera - (1987)
 Days of Inspector Ambrosio - (1988)
 I ragazzi di via Panisperna - (1989)
 Marrakech Express - (1989)
 'O Re - (1989)
 Women in Arms - (1991)

Bibliography
 Marsillach Acting Academy webpage,  (Accessed 28 April 2007)
 New York Times Filmography webpage for "Christina Marsillach",  (Accessed 28 April 2007)

References

External links
 Marsillach Acting Academy Madrid
 

1963 births
Living people
Actresses from Madrid
20th-century Spanish actresses